The Horns of Hattin is an extinct volcano with twin peaks overlooking the plains of Hattin in the Lower Galilee, Israel.

Kurûn Hattîn is believed to be the site of the Battle of Hattin, Saladin's victory over the Crusaders in 1187. The Battle of Hattin was fought in summer when the grass was tinder-dry. Saladin's troops set fire to the grass, after cutting off the Crusaders' access to water in the Sea of Galilee. Saladin built a "victory dome,"  Qubbat al-Nasr, on the hill. Thietmar, a German pilgrim who visited the site in 1217, wrote that the "temple Saladin had erected to his gods after the victory is now desolate."  In the early 17th century, ruins were found on the summit that appeared to be those of a church. Prior to 1948, an Arab village, Hittin, lay at the foot of the hill. Excavations were carried out on the hill in 1976 and 1981.

Some scholars have identified the hill with the Mount of Beatitudes, where Jesus delivered his Sermon on the Mount. Writing in 1864, Fergus Ferguson describes it as the "supposed" site, because although "its position corresponds with the particulars of the narrative", no one can declare with any certainty that He gave a sermon at that exact spot."

References

Bibliography

Crusade places
Archaeological sites in Israel
Protected areas of Northern District (Israel)
Volcanoes of Israel